Gadaipur, Mehrauli, is a village in the South Delhi district of New Delhi.

References

Villages in South Delhi district
Neighbourhoods in Delhi
Mehrauli